The following is a list of notable deaths in April 2014.

Entries for each day are listed alphabetically by surname. A typical entry lists information in the following sequence:
Name, age, country of citizenship and reason for notability, established cause of death, reference.

April 2014

1
Bai Dongcai, 98, Chinese politician.
Andreas Bjørkum, 82, Norwegian philologist.
Anker Buch, 74, Danish violinist.
Pierre Capretz, 89, French linguist and academic, creator of French in Action series.
Melissa Minnich Coleman, 96, American architect.
Guillermo Delgado, 83, Peruvian footballer.
King Fleming, 91, American jazz pianist, natural causes.
Rudolph Hargrave, 89, American judge, member of the Oklahoma Supreme Court (1978–2010), Chief Justice (1989–1990, 2001–2002).
Jacques Le Goff, 90, French historian.
Andrew Joseph McDonald, 90, American Roman Catholic prelate, Bishop of Little Rock (1972–2000).
Bill Mitchell, 85, Canadian ice hockey player (Detroit Red Wings), kidney failure.
Carlos Oneto, 84, Peruvian actor and comic.
Merimeri Penfold, 93, New Zealand Māori language academic (University of Auckland), cancer.
Rolf Rendtorff, 88, German academic, Emeritus Professor of Old Testament (University of Heidelberg).
Harry Rowe, 89, Australian footballer and cricketer.
Colin Scott, 80, British Anglican prelate, Bishop of Hulme (1984–1998).
John W. Shelton, 85, American politician, member of the West Virginia House of Delegates (1995–2004).
Alida van der Anker-Doedens, 91, Dutch Olympic silver-medalist sprint canoer (1948).
 Keane Wallis-Bennett, 12, British student, crushed in wall collapse.
Norman Warner, 70, Canadian politician and insurance broker, cancer.

2
Taha Basry, 67, Egyptian football player and manager.
Ibrahim Bin Shakaran, 34, Moroccan militant, shot.
Richard Brick, 68, American film producer (Deconstructing Harry) and executive, New York City Film Commissioner (1992–1994), esophageal cancer.
Stephanie Camp, 46, American historian, cancer.
Robert Clodius, 93, American academic. 
Everett De Roche, 67, Australian screenwriter, cancer.
Harris Goldsmith, 77, American pianist and critic. 
Sandy Grossman, 78, American sports director (CBS Sports, Fox Sports), directed 10 Super Bowls, cancer.
Lyndsie Holland, 75, English opera singer and actress.
Lucy Hood, 56, American television executive (News Corporation), President of the Academy of Television Arts & Sciences (since 2013), cancer.
Glyn Jones, 82, South African writer and actor.
Mamoon Kazi, 78, Pakistani judge, member of the Supreme Court (1997–2000) and Sindh High Court (1985–1997).
Michael Pearse Lacey, 97, Canadian Roman Catholic prelate, Auxiliary Bishop of Toronto (1979–1993).
Allan Lindsay, 88, British Olympic athlete.
Miloš Mikeln, 83, Slovene writer. 
Consuelo Moure, 67, Colombian actress, lung cancer.
Carl Epting Mundy, Jr., 78, American military officer, Commandant of the Marine Corps and member of the Joint Chiefs of Staff (1991–1995), Merkel cell carcinoma.
Alfred Niepieklo, 86, German footballer.
Mary Lou Petty, 98, American Olympic swimmer (1936).
Unnikrishnan Puthur, 80, Indian novelist.
Gustavo Rodríguez, 67, Venezuelan film, stage and television actor.
Vern Rutsala, 80, American author and poet.
Alieu Badara Saja Taal, 70, Gambian academic and newspaper executive, managing director of The Daily Observer, liver infection.
Mahjoub Sharif, 66, Sudanese poet and activist.
David Werdyger, 94, Polish-born American Hasidic singer.
Urs Widmer, 75, Swiss author.

3
Joseph Archibald, 80, Kittitian-born British Virgin Islander jurist, member of the Eastern Caribbean Supreme Court.
Andrei Bodiu, 48, Romanian poet.
Máximo Cajal López, 79, Spanish diplomat.
Régine Deforges, 78, French author, editor, director and playwright.
Akira Endo, 75, Japanese-born American conductor.
Pedro Fré, 89, Brazilian Roman Catholic prelate, Bishop of Corumbá (1985–1989) and Barretos (1989–2000).
Edvard Grimstad, 81, Norwegian politician, MP for Østfold (1989–1997), Governor of Østfold (1998–2003).
Norval Horner, 83, Canadian politician, MP for Battleford—Kindersley (1972–1974).
Fred Kida, 93, American cartoonist.
Virginie Korte-van Hemel, 84, Dutch politician, Deputy Minister of Justice (1982–1989).
Hans-Günther Lange, 97, German U-boat officer, recipient of the Knight's Cross of the Iron Cross with Oak Leaves.
Paul Lüönd, 63, Swiss musician and politician.
Jovan Pavlović, 77, Serbian Orthodox prelate, Metropolitan Bishop of Zagreb, Ljubljana and Italy.
Prince Michael of Prussia, 74, German author.
Heribert Reitböck, 80, Austrian neuroscientist.
John Ryan, 86, Irish politician, Leas-Cheann Comhairle (1982–1987).
Paul Salamunovich, 86, American choral director (Los Angeles Master Chorale) and film conductor (Dracula), complications from West Nile virus.
Tommy Lynn Sells, 49, American serial killer, execution by lethal injection.
Arthur Smith, 93, American musician and songwriter ("Guitar Boogie", "Dueling Banjos").
Ed Spencer, 85, American race car driver.
Dame Dorothy Winstone, 95, New Zealand educationalist and academic.

4
José Aguilar, 55, Cuban Olympic bronze-medalist light-welterweight boxer (1980), cerebral infarction.
Len Ardill, 83, Australian politician, member of the Queensland Legislative Assembly for Salisbury (1986–1992) and Archerfield (1992–1998).
İsmet Atlı, 83, Turkish Olympic champion light heavyweight freestyle wrestler (1960).
James Bates, 61, American conductor.
Dave Blakey, 84, English footballer (Chesterfield).
William W. Blanton, 90, American politician, member of the Texas House of Representatives (1976–1988), pneumonia.
Archie Boyd, 95, English Royal Air Force officer.
Eleanor de Freitas, 23, English false rape victim, suicide by hanging.
Joseph A. Doyle, 93, American lawyer, Assistant Secretary of the Navy (Manpower and Reserve Affairs) (1979–1981).
Willie Duggan, 88, Irish Olympic boxer.
Kumba Ialá, 61, Bissau-Guinean politician, President (2000–2003), cardiopulmonary arrest.
Charles Jordan, 76, American politician.
Peter Liechti, 63, Swiss filmmaker.
Margo MacDonald, 70, Scottish politician, MP for Glasgow Govan (1973–1974), MSP for Lothian (since 1999), Parkinson's disease.
Klaus Meyer, 76, German footballer.
Anja Niedringhaus, 48, German photojournalist (Associated Press), Pulitzer Prize winner for Breaking News Photography (2005), shot.
Curtis Bill Pepper, 96, American journalist (Newsweek) and author.
Muhammad Qutb, 95, Egyptian Islamist author and academic.
Emma Reed, 88, American Olympic athlete.
Richard Small, 68, American racehorse trainer (Concern), cancer.
Gyula Szabó, 83, Hungarian actor.

5
Azamour, 13, Irish racehorse and sire, euthanised.
Óscar Avilés, 90, Peruvian guitarist and singer.
Poul Erik Bech, 76, Danish football manager.
Willis Blair, 90, Canadian politician, Mayor of East York (1973–1975).
Andy Davidson, 81, Scottish footballer (Hull City).
Alan Davie, 93, Scottish painter and musician.
Mariano Díaz, 74, Spanish Olympic racing cyclist.
Antonio Díaz Gil, 79, Spanish footballer.
Rolv Enge, 92, Norwegian resistance member and architect.
Stuart Fullerton, 74, American entomologist (University of Central Florida).
Leif Haanes, 81, Norwegian ship-owner and Christian leader.
Wayne Henderson, 74, American jazz trombonist (The Jazz Crusaders) and record producer, heart failure.
Rhondda Alder Kelly, 87, Australian model, Miss Australia (1946).
Peter Matthiessen, 86, American author (At Play in the Fields of the Lord, The Snow Leopard), leukemia.
L. B. McGinnis, 72, American novelist.
Stanislaus Okurut, 84, Ugandan politician, Minister of Labour, Sports and Transport, heart failure.
John Pinette, 50, American comedian and actor (The Punisher, Junior), pulmonary embolism.
Gordon Smith, 59, Scottish footballer (St Johnstone, Aston Villa).
Yvonne Stoffel-Wagener, 82, Luxembourgian Olympic gymnast.
Peter Thorne, 90, English fighter pilot and diplomat.
José Wilker, 66, Brazilian actor (Medicine Man) and director, heart attack.

6
Mary Anderson, 96, American actress (Gone With the Wind). 
Jacques Castérède, 87, French composer.
Leee Black Childers, 68, American punk rock and art photographer (The Factory, Andy Warhol).
Liv Dommersnes, 91, Norwegian actress.
Sir Maurice Drake, 91, British judge of the High Court of England and Wales.
Charles Farthing, 60, New Zealand doctor, heart attack.
Peter Kaberere, 30, Kenyan gospel singer, electrocuted.
Erzsi Kovács, 85, Hungarian pop singer and performer.
Domenico Mennitti, 75, Italian politician, Mayor of Brindisi (2004–2011).
Mickey Rooney, 93, American actor (The Black Stallion, Breakfast at Tiffany's, It's a Mad, Mad, Mad, Mad World), Emmy winner (1982), natural causes.
Leandro Rovirosa Wade, 96, Mexican politician and engineer, Governor of Tabasco (1977–1982).
Farhad Sepahbody, 85, Iranian exiled diplomat, Ambassador to Morocco (1976–1979).
Chuck Stone, 89, American navigator, journalist and academic, Tuskegee Airman during World War II, co-founder of the NABJ.
Massimo Tamburini, 70, Italian motorcycle designer (Ducati 916, MV Agusta F4), lung cancer.
Van Vlahakis, 79, Greek-born American chemist.

7
Andrei Aleksenko, 80, Russian scientist.
Ron Barkhouse, 87, Canadian politician. 
Kevin Bokeili, 51, French science fiction writer.
Ashish Bose, 83, Indian demographer, coined "BIMARU" term, fall.
Claudine Bouché, 88, French film editor (Shoot the Piano Player, Jules and Jim).
George Dureau, 83, American painter and photographer, Alzheimer's disease.
Peaches Geldof, 25, English television presenter, writer and model, heroin overdose.
Sandy Green, 88, British mathematician.
Alexandre Guyodo, 91, French Olympic steeplechaser (1948).
Xaver Höger, 84, German Olympic athlete.
Noel Knockwood, 81, Canadian Mi'kmaq spiritual leader and civil servant, Sergeant-at-Arms for Legislative Assembly of Nova Scotia (2000–2005), National Aboriginal Achievement Award (2002), stroke.
Ernest Kurnow, 101, American academic.
V. K. Murthy, 90, Indian cinematographer (Kaagaz Ke Phool, Pyaasa, Sahib Bibi Aur Ghulam), recipient of the Dadasaheb Phalke Award (2008).
Perlita Neilson, 80, British actress.
Zeituni Onyango, 61, Kenyan computer programmer, involved in immigration case during 2008 US presidential election campaign, breast cancer and respiratory ailments.
Jack Satter, 92, American philanthropist, partly owned the New York Yankees.
Jerry Sharkey, 71, American Wright brothers historian, conceived idea for Dayton Aviation Heritage National Historical Park, heart failure.
John Shirley-Quirk, 82, English bass-baritone opera singer, cancer.
George Shuffler, 88, American Hall of Fame bluegrass musician (The Stanley Brothers).
Steve Smith, 64, American politician, member of the Minnesota House of Representatives (1999–2012).
Josep Maria Subirachs, 87, Spanish Catalan sculptor and painter, Parkinson's disease.
Scato Swu, 90, Indian politician.
Frans van der Lugt, 75, Dutch Jesuit priest, shot.
Čedo Vuković, 93, Montenegrin writer.
Royce Waltman, 72, American college basketball coach (Indiana State).
Emilio Yap, 88, Filipino businessman and philanthropist.

8
Starla Brodie, 58, American poker player.
Jim W. Brown, 87, Australian footballer.
Sandy Brown, 75, Scottish footballer (Everton). 
Emmanuel III Delly, 86, Iraqi Chaldean Catholic hierarch, Patriarch of Babylon (2003–2012).
Karlheinz Deschner, 89, German writer and activist.
Robert Dickson, 88, Australian architect. 
Shrish Chandra Dikshit, 91, Indian politician, MP for Varanasi (1991–1996), DGP for Uttar Pradesh.
Charles Anthony Fager, 90, Bahamian neurosurgeon.
Jay R. Galbraith, 75, American organizational theorist.
Phil Hardy, 69, British film and music journalist.
Eric Harroun, 31, American jihadist, drug overdose.
Andrew Intamba, 67, Namibian diplomat and security director, first Ambassador to Egypt (since 2008), Director of the Central Intelligence Service (1991–2007).
Art Kimball, 72, American politician, member of the Utah Senate (1977–1981).
Ghiță Licu, 68, Romanian Olympic bronze and silver medallist handball player (1972, 1976).
Ivan Mercep, 84, New Zealand architect (Museum of New Zealand Te Papa Tongarewa).
Monte Olsen, 57, American politician, member of the Wyoming House of Representatives (2002–2008), myocardial ischemia.
Herbert Schoen, 84, German footballer.
Cornelius Taiwo, 103, Nigerian academic.
The Ultimate Warrior, 54, American Hall of Fame professional wrestler (WWE), heart attack.
Adrianne Wadewitz, 37, American scholar, rockclimbing fall.

9
Manuel Alejandro Aponte Gómez, 43, Mexican bodyguard (Joaquín Guzmán Loera), shot.
Python Anghelo, 59, Romanian-born American artist, video game and pinball machine designer (Joust, Taxi, PIN•BOT), cancer.
Gil Askey, 89, American-born Australian musician and composer (Lady Sings the Blues), lymphoma.
Chris Banks, 41, American football player (Denver Broncos, Atlanta Falcons). 
Jacob Birnbaum, 87, German-born American Jewish activist, founder of the Student Struggle for Soviet Jewry.
Peter Michael Blayney, 93, Australian artist.
Jos Chabert, 81, Belgian politician, Minister of State (2009).
Joan Crespo Hita, 87, Spanish road bicycle racer.
Rory Ellinger, 72, American politician, member of the Missouri House of Representatives (since 2010), liver cancer.
Norman Girvan, 72, Jamaican professor and politician, Secretary General of the Association of Caribbean States (2000–2004), fall.
Robin Holliday, 81, British molecular biologist.
Sir James Holt, 91, British medieval historian.
Boniface Lele, 66, Kenyan Roman Catholic prelate, Archbishop of Mombasa (2005–2013), Bishop of Kitui (1995–2005), cardiac arrest.
René Mertens, 92, Belgian cyclist.
Eddie Miller, 82, American basketball player.
Aelay Narendra, 67, Indian politician, MP for Nizamabad (1999–2004) and Medak (2004–2008), Andhra Pradesh MLA for Himayatnagar (1983–1999).
Val Ogden, 90, American politician, member of the Washington House of Representatives (1991–2003), cancer.
A. N. R. Robinson, 87, Trinbagonian politician, President (1997–2003), Prime Minister (1986–1991), recognized for role in establishing the International Criminal Court.
Ferdinando Terruzzi, 90, Italian Olympic champion cyclist (1948).
Svetlana Velmar-Janković, 80, Serbian writer.

10
Dominique Baudis, 66, French journalist, writer and politician, Mayor of Toulouse (1983–2001), cancer.
Justin Marie Bomboko, 86, Congolese politician, Head of Government (1960–1961), Foreign Minister (1960–1963, 1965–1969, 1981).
George Bornemissza, 90, Australian entomologist and ecologist.
Ray Colledge, 91, British climber and mountaineer.
Commendable, 16, American Thoroughbred racehorse, won the 2000 Belmont Stakes.
Joe Dini, 85, American politician, member of the Nevada House of Representatives (1967–2002).
Bill Doolittle, 90, American football player and coach (Western Michigan Broncos). 
László Felkai, 73, Hungarian Olympic champion and dual bronze medallist water polo player (1960, 1964, 1968).
Jim Flaherty, 64, Canadian politician, Minister of Finance (2006–2014), MP for Whitby—Oshawa (since 2006), MPP for Whitby—Ajax (1995–2005), heart attack.
Phyllis Frelich, 70, American Tony Award-winning actress (Children of a Lesser God), progressive supranuclear palsy.
Ken Greengrass, 87, American television producer.
Carol Grimaldi, 75, American restaurateur, co-founder of Grimaldi's Pizzeria, cancer.
Ján Hirka, 90, Slovak Catholic hierarch, Bishop of Prešov (1990–2002).
Richard Hoggart, 95, British academic and author (The Uses of Literacy), dementia.
Thomas M. Jacobs, 87, American Olympic skier (1952).
Doris Pilkington Garimara, 76, Australian author (Follow the Rabbit-Proof Fence), ovarian cancer.
Gregory White Smith, 62, American biographer (Jackson Pollock: An American Saga), Pulitzer Prize winner (1991), brain tumor.
Anatoly Sukhorukov, 78, Russian physicist.
Eddy Thomas, 82, Jamaican dancer, choreographer and teacher, co-founder of National Dance Theatre Company.
Sue Townsend, 68, British novelist and playwright (Adrian Mole series), stroke.
Sidney Weintraub, 91, American economist.

11
Alfredo Alcón, 84, Argentine actor (The Innocents, El Santo de la Espada, Sugar Harvest), respiratory disease.
Antonio Aldonza, 88, Spanish footballer.
Eppie Archuleta, 92, American weaving artist, recipient of the National Heritage Fellowship (1985).
Nandu Bhende, 58, Indian musician and actor, heart attack.
Rolf Brem, 88, Swiss graphic artist, sculptor and illustrator.
Hal Cooper, 91, American television director and producer (I Dream of Jeannie, Maude, Gimme a Break!), heart failure.
Edna Doré, 92, British actress (EastEnders, Les Misérables, Another Year), emphysema.
Dunstan Endawie Enchana, 78, Malaysian politician, Sarawak MLA for Krian, Deputy Chief Minister (1977–1979), High Commissioner to Australia and New Zealand.
Cele Hahn, 72, American politician and media owner (WNNZ (AM), WNNZ-FM), member of the Massachusetts House of Representatives (1995–2003).
Bill Henry, 86, American baseball player (Boston Red Sox, Cincinnati Reds), heart attack.
Zander Hollander, 91, American sportswriter, journalist, editor and archivist.
Lou Hudson, 69, American basketball player (St. Louis Hawks, Los Angeles Lakers), complications from a stroke.
Myer S. Kripke, 100, American rabbi and philanthropist.
Bernard J. Lechner, 82, American electronics engineer (RCA).
Leonard Levy, 74, Jamaican cricketer.
William J. Lyons, Jr., 92, American politician, member of the Connecticut House of Representatives and Senate.
Eugene McGehee, 85, American lawyer, jurist and politician, member of the Louisiana House of Representatives (1960–1972).
Helga Mees, 76, German Olympic silver- and bronze-medalist fencer (1964).
Sergey Nepobedimy, 92, Soviet rocket designer (3M6 Shmel, Arena, OTR-23 Oka, OTR-21 Tochka, 9K11 Malyutka).
Ron Pundak, 58, Israeli diplomat, involved in Oslo I Accord, cancer.
Sanggeun, 9, South Korean dog actor, complications of cancer.
Patrick Seale, 83, Northern Irish journalist, foreign correspondent and historian (The Observer), brain cancer.
Rolando Ugolini, 89, Italian-born British footballer (Middlesbrough).
Jesse Winchester, 69, American musician and songwriter, bladder cancer.
Carl Zimmermann, 96, American news anchor (WITI) and World War II war correspondent.
Darrell Zwerling, 85, American actor (Chinatown, Grease, Starsky and Hutch).

12
Pierre Autin-Grenier, 67, French author.
Robin Capell, 79, South African cricketer.
Jerry Carle, 90, American football, basketball, and baseball player and coach.
James M. Coleman, 90, American politician, member of the New Jersey General Assembly (1966–1972).
Eduard Gaugler, 85, German economist.
Beverly Hanson, 89, American golfer, U.S. Amateur Champion (1950), LPGA Championship (1955), Western Open (1956), Titleholders Championship (1958), complications of Alzheimer's and COPD.
Robert Harder, 84, American politician, member of the Kansas House of Representatives (1961–1967), brain tumor.
Fred Ho, 56, American saxophonist, composer and social activist, complications from colorectal cancer.
Brita Koivunen, 82, Finnish schlager singer.
Pierre-Henri Menthéour, 53, French racing cyclist, cancer.
My Flag, 21, American Thoroughbred racehorse, euthanized.
Øystein Øystå, 79, Norwegian writer.
Maurício Alves Peruchi, 24, Brazilian footballer, traffic collision.
Robert Potter, 64, British geographer.
Hal Smith, 82, American baseball player (St. Louis Cardinals).
Billy Standridge, 60, American race car driver and team owner (NASCAR, Nationwide Series), cancer.
Hamish Watt, 88, Scottish politician, MP for Banffshire (1974–1979).

13
Michael Boddy, 80, English-Australian actor and writer. (death announced on this date)
Howard Brandt, 75, American physicist.
John Brunsdon, 80, British artist.
Emma Castelnuovo, 100, Italian mathematician.
Mahay Choramo, Ethiopian evangelist.
Peter Clarke, 84, South African artist.
Peter Drummond-Murray of Mastrick, 84, Scottish herald and banker.
Fred Enke, 89, American football player (Detroit Lions, Philadelphia Eagles), dementia.
Sally Haydon, 55, American equestrian and academic.
Edward Kamuda, 74, American historian, co-founder of the Titanic Historical Society, consultant on Titanic.
Ernesto Laclau, 78, Argentine post-Marxist political theorist, heart attack.
Otto Petersen, 53, American ventriloquist and comedian (Otto & George).
Michael Ruppert, 63, American author, journalist, radio show host and conspiracy hawk, suicide by gunshot.
Theoklitos Setakis, 83, Greek Orthodox hierarch, Metropolitan Bishop of Ioannina (since 1975).
Irene Shepard, 91, American politician, member of the New Hampshire House of Representatives.
Rafał Sznajder, 41, Polish Olympic fencer (1996, 2000, 2004), heart attack.

14
Kshetra Pratap Adhikary, 70–71, Nepali poet and writer, heart attack.
Roland Issifu Alhassan, 81, Ghanaian diplomat and politician, Ambassador to Germany (2001–2006), MP for Tolon-Kumbungu (1969–1971, 1979–1981), co-founder of the New Patriotic Party.
Ian Askew, 92, British officer.
Howard Behrens, 80, American artist.
Reid Buckley, 83, American novelist, public speaker and columnist, cancer.
Nina Cassian, 89, Romanian poet, heart attack.
Joe Curl, 59, American basketball coach (University of Houston), heart failure.
Phillip Hayes Dean, 83, American stage actor, director and playwright, aortic aneurysm.
Reg Egan, 86,  Australian footballer.
Peter Ellson, 88, English footballer (Crewe Alexandra). 
Brian Harradine, 79, Australian politician, Senator for Tasmania (1975–2005), longest-serving independent parliamentarian, stroke.
Thorleif Holth, 83, Norwegian politician.
Crad Kilodney, 66, Canadian writer, cancer.
Ingeborg von Kusserow, 95, German actress.
Albert Manent, 83, Spanish writer and activist.
Rudolf Matutinović, 87, Croatian sculptor.
Wally Olins, 83, British business consultancy and public relations executive, Chairman of Saffron Brand Consultants.
Manuel Ortega, 92, Spanish painter.
Armando Peraza, 89, Cuban-born American Latin jazz percussionist (Santana, George Shearing, Dave Brubeck), pneumonia.
Paul Sadala, Congolese militant, shot.
Davorin Savnik, 85, Slovene industrial designer and architect.
Bill Sinegal, 85, American rhythm and blues musician.
Mick Staton, 74, American politician, member of the U.S. House of Representatives for West Virginia's 3rd district (1981–1983).

15
Kirsten Bishopric, 50, Canadian voice actress (Sailor Moon, Jacob Two-Two Meets the Hooded Fang), lung cancer.
Little Joe Cook, 91, American doo-wop singer and songwriter.
Robert-Casimir Tonyui Messan Dosseh-Anyron, 88, Togolese Roman Catholic prelate, Archbishop of Lomé (1962–1992).
John L. Ducker, 91, American politician, member of the Florida House of Representatives (1960–1968).
Shane Gibson, 35, American guitarist (Korn, stOrk), complications from a blood clotting disorder.
Robert Heard, 84, American journalist (Associated Press), complications from hip surgery.
William Hird, 92, Australian cricketer.
John Houbolt, 95, American aerospace engineer, complications from Parkinson's disease.
Júnior, 70, Spanish singer and actor.
Luo Qingchang, 96, Chinese politician, member of the Central Committee (1973–1987) and Standing Committee (1978–1983).
Thomas C. Salamone, 87, American politician, member of the Connecticut House of Representatives (1963–1971).
Ratchanee Sripraiwan, 82, Thai language scholar, author and academic.
Claudio Tello, 50, Chilean footballer (Cobreloa), cancer.
Rosemary Tonks, 85, British poet.
Eliseo Verón, 78, Argentine sociologist, anthropologist and semiotician, cancer.
Hugo Villar, 88, Uruguayan physician and politician.
Sir Owen Woodhouse, 97, New Zealand judge, member of the Supreme Court, President of the Court of Appeal (1981–1986).
Anselmo Zarza Bernal, 97, Mexican Roman Catholic prelate, Bishop of Linares (1962–1966) and León (1966–1992).

16
Basil Anthony, 76, Sri Lankan cricket umpire.
Joan Blanch, 77, Spanish lawyer and politician, Mayor of Badalona (1983–1999), cancer.
Anne Briscoe, 96, American biochemist.
Brock Brower, 82, American writer.
Gyude Bryant, 65, Liberian politician, Chairman of the Transitional Government (2003–2006).
Douglas L. Coleman, 82, Canadian scientist and philanthropist, recipient of the Shaw Prize (2009) and the Albert Lasker Award (2010).
Richard Greenfield, 71, American newspaper publisher (Jewish Ledger).
Khosrow Jahanbani, 72, Iranian royal (Qajar dynasty).
Stan Kelly-Bootle, 84, British songwriter, author and computer engineer.
Frank Kopel, 65, Scottish footballer (Dundee United), complications from dementia.
Jiří Načeradský, 74, Czech artist.
Basil A. Paterson, 87, American politician and labor lawyer, New York Secretary of State (1979–1983), member of the New York Senate (1965–1970).
Leonard Rosen, 83, American bankruptcy lawyer, co-founder of Wachtell, Lipton, Rosen & Katz.
Aulis Rytkönen, 85, Finnish football player and manager.
Jacques Servier, 92, French physician and pharmaceutical executive, founder of Servier Laboratories.
Ernst Florian Winter, 90, Austrian-American historian and political scientist.

17
Ashwath Aiyappa, 30, Indian cricketer, drowned.
Mayra Alejandra, 58, Venezuelan actress, cancer.
Nancy Brataas, 86, American politician, member of the Minnesota Senate (1975–1992), emphysema and COPD.
Steve Cappiello, 89, American politician, Mayor of Hoboken, New Jersey (1981–1984).
Cheo Feliciano, 78, American Puerto Rican salsa and bolero composer and singer, traffic collision.
Andrés Uriel Gallego, 64, Colombian civil engineer and politician, Minister of Transport (2002–2010), cancer.
Gabriel García Márquez, 87, Colombian author (One Hundred Years of Solitude, Love in the Time of Cholera), laureate of the Nobel Prize in Literature (1982), pneumonia.
Michael C. Janeway, 73, American newspaper editor (Boston Globe), academic and author, cancer.
Bernat Klein, 91, Yugoslavian-born Scottish fashion designer and spy.
McDowell Lee, 89, American politician, member of the Alabama House of Representatives (1955–1962), Secretary of the Alabama Senate (1963–2011), cancer.
Wojciech Leśnikowski, 75, Polish architect and academic, cancer.
Henry Maksoud, 85, Brazilian businessman, cardiac arrest.
Anthony Marriott, 83, British actor and playwright.
Karl Meiler, 64, German tennis player, complications from a fall.
Raul Bragança Neto, 68, São Toméan politician, Prime Minister (1996–1999).
L. Jay Oliva, 80, American academic and educator, President of New York University (1991–2002), pancreatic cancer.
Volodymyr Ivanovych Rybak, 72–73, Ukrainian politician.
Karpal Singh, 73, Malaysian lawyer and politician, MP for Jelutong (1978–1999) and Bukit Gelugor (since 2004), Chairman of DAP (2004–2014), traffic collision.
Lloyd Sommerlad, 95, Australian politician, member of the New South Wales Legislative Council (1955–1967).
Nikolaos Vorvolakos, 83, Greek Army officer, head of the Cypriot National Guard (1993–1998).

18
Habib Boularès, 80, Tunisian politician and diplomat, President of the Chamber of Deputies (1991–1997).
David W. Burke, 78, American television news executive, first chairman of the Broadcasting Board of Governors, President of CBS News (1988–1990).
Donald Dahl, 69, American politician, member of the Kansas House of Representatives (1996–2008), plane crash.
Guru Dhanapal, 55, Indian film director (Unna Nenachen Pattu Padichen, Suyamvaram, Periya Manushan).
Mirko Đorđević, 75, Serbian publicist.
Sanford Jay Frank, 59, American television comedy writer (Late Night with David Letterman), brain cancer.
Robert Keith Gray, 92, American lobbyist and public relations official.
Johnley Hatimoana, 57, Solomon Islands politician, MP for Ngella (since 2013), pneumonia.
Deon Jackson, 68, American soul singer and songwriter, brain hemorrhage.
Eduard Kosolapov, 38, Russian footballer, suicide by gunshot.
Trygve Lange-Nielsen, 92, Norwegian barrister and judge.
Ramon Malla Call, 91, Spanish Roman Catholic prelate, Bishop of Lleida (1968–1999), acting Co-Prince of Andorra (1969–1971).
David McClarty, 63, Northern Irish politician, MLA for East Londonderry (since 1998), cancer.
Antonín Molčík, 74, Czech actor.
Tim Moran, 95, American politician, member of the Utah House of Representatives (1984–1996).
Brian Priestman, 87, British maestro and conductor (Denver Symphony Orchestra).
Andrew Sessler, 85, American physicist and academic (University of California, Berkeley), recipient of the Enrico Fermi Award (2013), cancer.
Zev Sufott, 86, British-born Israeli diplomat, Ambassador to the Netherlands and China.
Dylan Tombides, 20, Australian footballer (West Ham United), testicular cancer.

19
Bashir Ahmad, 74, Bangladeshi playback singer.
Steve Antone, 92, American politician, member of the Idaho House of Representatives (1968–1996).
Theophil Antonicek, 76, Austrian musicologist.
Lindy Berry, 86, Canadian CFL football player (Edmonton Eskimos), complications from pneumonia.
Helena Bliss, 96, American actress and soprano.
Yuriy Chyrkov, 66, Russian football player and coach.
Derek Cooper, 88, British broadcaster (The Food Programme) and food journalist, Parkinson's disease.
Luciano do Valle, 66, Brazilian sports commentator.
George Downton, 85, English cricketer (Kent).
Kan Cheong Dunn, 89, Taiwanese ambassador.
Richard Elrod, 80, American sheriff (Cook County, Illinois) and politician, member of the Illinois House of Representatives (1968–1970), liver cancer and cirrhosis.
Diomid Gherman, 86, Moldovan academic and politician.
John R. Gibson, 88, American senior circuit judge.
Mimi Kok, 80, Dutch actress, pulmonary disease.
Aaron Landes, 84, American rabbi and U.S. Navy chaplain, leukemia.
Ian McIntyre, 82, Scottish radio broadcaster and executive (BBC Radio 3, BBC Radio 4).
Mark Prothero, 57, American swimmer (USA Swimming) and defense lawyer (Gary Ridgway), lung cancer.
Erik Schmidt, 88, Estonian painter and writer.
Kevin Sharp, 43, American country music singer, complications from a digestive disorder.
Adhik Shirodkar, Indian lawyer and politician.
Sonia Silvestre, 61, Dominican singer and announcer, stroke.
Barry Sterling, 70, American politician, member of the Tennessee House of Representatives.
John Stopp, 80, Australian politician, member of the Tasmanian Legislative Council (1983–1995).
Frits Thors, 104, Dutch journalist and news anchor.
Hrant Vardanyan, 65, Armenian businessman, heart disease.
Arthur Woodhouse, 80, English cricketer.

20
Ruth Baltra Moreno, 75, Chilean actress, playwright, teacher, and theater director.
Mithat Bayrak, 85, Turkish Olympic champion wrestler (1956, 1960) and trainer.
Bill Blair, 92, American baseball player (Indianapolis Clowns), journalist and civil rights activist.
Torrey C. Brown, 77, American politician, member of the Maryland House of Delegates (1970–1994), Secretary for Natural Resources (1983–1994), heart disease.
Rubin Carter, 76, American middleweight boxer, subject of "Hurricane" and The Hurricane, prostate cancer.
Beanie Cooper, 86, American football coach.
Theodore Dollarhide, 65, American composer.
David Kerr, 86, British nephrologist.
Robert E. Longacre, 92, American linguist.
Alistair MacLeod, 77, Canadian author, complications from a stroke.
George E. McDonald, 90, American labor union leader.
Benedikt Sarnov, 87, Russian author and literary critic.
Peter Scoones, 76, British underwater photographer (Life on Earth, Planet Earth, The Blue Planet).
Yoshio Shinozuka, 90, Japanese Imperial Army soldier (Unit 731).
Julian Wilson, 73, British horse racing correspondent and broadcaster (BBC), cancer.
Neville Wran, 87, Australian politician, Premier of New South Wales (1976–1986), dementia.

21
Edmund Abel, 92, American inventor, patented design for Mr. Coffee machine.
Eliza T. Dresang, 72, American academic and author.
Mundo Earwood, 61, American country music singer-songwriter, pancreatic cancer.
Herb Gray, 82, Canadian politician, Deputy Prime Minister (1997–2002), MP for Essex West (1962–1968) and Windsor West (1968–2002).
Janet Gray Hayes, 87, American politician, Mayor of San Jose (1975–1983), stroke.
George H. Heilmeier, 77, American inventor and technology executive, championed LCD displays, stroke.
Lionel Heinrich, 80, Canadian ice hockey player (Boston Bruins).
Craig Hill, 88, American actor (Whirlybirds, All About Eve).
Ladislav Hlaváček, 88, Czechoslovak football player (Dukla Prague).
Weldon Kern, 90, American basketball player (Oklahoma A&M Aggies).
Harry Koundakjian, 83, American news photographer and editor (Associated Press), complications from open heart surgery.
Alexander Lenkov, 70, Russian actor, People's Artist (1997).
Roy Matsumoto, 100, American World War II veteran, recipient of the Congressional Gold Medal (2011).
Arlene McQuade, 77, American television actress (The Goldbergs, The Milton Berle Show), Parkinson's disease.
Albert Onyeawuna, 78, Nigerian footballer (national team).
Ramón Pons, 73, Spanish actor (Murder in a Blue World), anemia.
Gene Timms, 81, American politician, member of the Oregon Senate (1982–2000).
Francisco Ovidio Vera Intriago, 71, Ecuadorian Roman Catholic prelate, Auxiliary Bishop of Portoviejo (since 1992), kidney disease.
Win Tin, 85, Burmese journalist and political prisoner, recipient of the UNESCO/Guillermo Cano World Press Freedom Prize (2001), renal failure.

22
Harry Bell, 89, English footballer (Middlesbrough).
Abdul Qadir, 70, Afghan politician, Minister of Defense (1978, 1982–1986).
Neil Chanmugam, 73, Sri Lankan cricketer.
John Hannigan, 75, Irish Gaelic footballer (Donegal).
Allen Jacobs, 72, American football player (Green Bay Packers, New York Giants), heart attack.
Bill Klucas, 72, American basketball coach, journalist and political consultant, liver cancer.
Jovan Krkobabić, 84, Serbian politician, Deputy Prime Minister (since 2008), Minister of Labour, Employment and Social Policy (since 2012).
Dennis Liwewe, 77, Zambian football player and commentator, liver failure.
Alfonso Márquez de la Plata, 80, Chilean politician, Minister of Agriculture (1977–1980), General Secretary of Government (1984) and Labour (1984–1988), pneumonia.
 Ricardo Mórtola, 63, Ecuadorian architect.
Mohammad Naseem, 90, British Islamic leader and political activist, chairman of Birmingham Central Mosque.
Chris Nkulor, Nigerian actor, kidney ailment.
Werner Potzernheim, 87, German Olympic bronze-medalist cyclist (1952).
Safely Kept, 28, American Thoroughbred racehorse, euthanized.
Gordon Smith, 93, British army officer.
Oswaldo Vigas, 90, Venezuelan painter.
Val Werier, 96, Canadian journalist (Winnipeg Free Press).

23
Benjamín Brea, 67, Spanish-born Venezuelan musician, stomach cancer.
Monte Geralds, 79, American politician, member of the Michigan House of Representatives.
Michael Glawogger, 54, Austrian film director (Workingman's Death, Whores' Glory, Slumming), malaria.
Władyslawa Górska, 94, Polish chess player.
Jaap Havekotte, 102, Dutch skater, skate inventor and centenarian.
 Kenneth A. R. Kennedy, 83, American archaeologist and paleontologist.
Federico Ling Altamirano, 75, Mexican diplomat and politician, Ambassador to the Vatican, Senator for Mexico City (2000–2006).
Connie Marrero, 102, Cuban baseball player (Washington Senators), oldest former Major League Baseball player.
Leonhard Pohl, 84, German Olympic runner (1956).
Lorenzo Relova, 98, Filipino judge, Associate Justice of the Supreme Court (1982–1986).
F. Michael Rogers, 92, American Air Force general, complications from Parkinson's disease.
Roby Schaeffer, 83, Luxembourgian Olympic sprinter.
Mark Shand, 62, British travel writer and conservationist, injuries sustained from a fall.
Patric Standford, 75, English composer.
Dixie Tan, 78, Singaporean cardiologist and politician, MP for Ulu Pandan (1984–1991), brain cancer.
Zhu Qizhen, 86, Chinese diplomat and politician, Vice Minister of Foreign Affairs (1984–1989), Ambassador to the United States (1989–1993).

24
Angeles Arrien, 73–74, Basque-American cultural anthropologist, educator, author, lecturer and consultant, pneumonia.
Ricardo Bauleo, 73, Argentine actor, heart failure.
Bogdan Borčić, 87, Slovene painter, printmaker, and educator.
Louis Gage, 85, American Olympic boxer.
Hans Hollein, 80, Austrian architect (Museum für Moderne Kunst, Haas House), laureate of the Pritzker Architecture Prize (1985), pneumonia.
Sandy Jardine, 65, Scottish footballer (Rangers, Hearts, national team), liver cancer.
Ken Kagaya, 70, Japanese politician.
James H. Kasler, 87, American Air Force officer, three-time recipient of the Air Force Cross. 
Michel Lang, 74, French film and television director, Alzheimer's disease.
Rolf Johan Lenschow, 85, Norwegian civil engineer.
Eugène Letendre, 82, French cyclist.
Moslem Malakouti, 89, Iranian Shiite cleric.
Ray Musto, 85, American politician, member of the U.S. House for Pennsylvania's 11th district (1980–1981), Pennsylvania House (1971–1980) and Senate (1983–2010), cancer.
Barry O'Keefe, 80, Australian judge, member of the NSW Supreme Court (1993–2004), Commissioner of the Independent Commission Against Corruption (1994–1999).
Konstantin Orbelyan, 85, Armenian composer and conductor.
Sister Ping, 65, Chinese convicted people smuggler, cancer. 
Bogdan Poniatowski, 82, Polish Olympic rower (1960) and coach.
Shobha Nagi Reddy, 45, Indian politician, Andhra Pradesh MLA for Allagadda (since 1996), traffic collision.
Tadeusz Różewicz, 92, Polish poet and playwright, recipient of the Austrian State Prize for European Literature (1982).
Eddie Rubin, 79, American rock and jazz drummer and composer, cardiac failure.
Vishweshwar Thool, 67, Indian cricketer.
Frederick C. Turner, 90, American Navy officer, vice admiral.
Jerzy Wieteski, 79, Polish footballer.

25
Flor Coffey, 93, Irish hurler.
Boniface Nyema Dalieh, 80, Liberian Roman Catholic prelate, Bishop of Cape Palmas (1973–2008).
Dandeniya Hemachandra de Silva, 81, Sri Lankan cricketer.
Dan Heap, 88, Canadian politician, MP for Spadina (1981–1988) and Trinity—Spadina (1988–1993), Alzheimer's disease.
James Higginbotham, 72, American philosopher of language.
William Judson Holloway, Jr., 90, American judge, member of the US 10th Circuit Court of Appeals (since 1968), respiratory illness.
Stanko Lorger, 83, Slovene Yugoslav Olympic hurdler (1952, 1956, 1960).
Paulo Malhães, 76, Brazilian soldier, heart attack.
Ernest G. McClain, 95, American professor emeritus of music, natural causes.
Earl Morrall, 79, American football player (Baltimore Colts, Detroit Lions, Miami Dolphins), complications from Parkinson's disease.
Mukund Varadarajan, 32, Indian army officer, awarded Ashok Chakra, shot.
Tito Vilanova, 45, Spanish football player and coach (Barcelona), throat cancer.
Stefanie Zweig, 81, German writer (Nowhere in Africa).

26
Georgy Adelson-Velsky, 92, Russian mathematician and computer scientist.
Bill Ash, 96, American-born British Marxist writer, Royal Canadian Air Force pilot during World War II.
David Brokenshire, 89, New Zealand potter and architect.
Joan Bruce, 86, British-born Australian actress (Dot and the Kangaroo).
José Moreira Bastos Neto, 61, Brazilian Roman Catholic prelate, Bishop of Três Lagoas (since 2009), heart attack.
Tony DiMidio, 71, American football player (Kansas City Chiefs).
Ole Enger, 65, Norwegian actor, cancer.
Jacqueline Ferrand, 96, French mathematician.
Manfred Fuchs, 75, German aerospace engineer, founded OHB System.
Protacio G. Gungon, 88, Filipino Roman Catholic prelate, Bishop of Antipolo (1983–2001).
Gerald Guralnik, 77, American physicist, co-original Higgs mechanism and Higgs boson theorist, recipient of the Sakurai Prize (2010).
Patrick Hanan, 87, New Zealand sinologist and author.
Adrian Haynes, 88, American Wampanoag chief.
Michael Heisley, 77, American billionaire aerospace defense executive (HEICO) and basketball franchise owner (Memphis Grizzlies), complications from a stroke.
Tim Hunt, 39, American professional baseball player and USA national softball team member, ATV accident.
David Langner, 62, American football player (Auburn Tigers), key player in "Punt Bama Punt" (1972 Iron Bowl), cancer.
Sandro Lopopolo, 74, Italian Olympic silver-medalist lightweight boxer (1960), WBC champion light welterweight (1966–1967), respiratory infection.
Lee Marshall, 64, American radio personality, professional wrestling announcer and voice actor (Tony The Tiger), esophageal cancer.
Tony Ninos, 94, American politician and hotelier, Mayor of Cocoa, Florida (1959–1963), member of the Florida House of Representatives (1966–1967).
Aloísio Roque Oppermann, 77, Brazilian Roman Catholic prelate, Archbishop of Uberaba (1996–2012). (body discovered on this date)
Antonio Pica, 83, Spanish actor.
Judith Pinsker, 74, American television writer (Ryan's Hope, General Hospital).
Leroy Powell, 80, American baseball player (Chicago White Sox).
DJ Rashad, 34, American footwork disc jockey, blood clot in leg.
Seth Roberts, 61, American psychologist and self-help author.
Paul Robeson, Jr., 86, American archivist and author, lymphoma.
Adolf Seilacher, 89, German palaeontologist.
Glen Stassen, 78, American Baptist ethicist and theologian, cancer.
Philip Sugden, 67, English historian and true crime writer (Jack the Ripper), cerebral haemorrhage. (body discovered on this date)
Stan Turley, 93, American politician, member of the Arizona Senate (1973–1985) and House of Representatives (1965–1973), Speaker (1967–1968), natural causes.

27
Yigal Arnon, 84, Israeli lawyer.
Vujadin Boškov, 82, Yugoslav Olympic silver-medalist football player (1956) and coach (national team, Real Madrid).
Al Clayton, 79, American photographer.
Dan Colchico, 76, American football player (San Francisco 49ers), complications from heart surgery.
 Theo Constanté, 80, Ecuadorian artist.
Micheline Dax, 90, French comedian and actress.
Rakesh Deewana, 44–45, Indian actor, complications from bariatric surgery.
DJ E-Z Rock, 46, American hip-hop musician (Rob Base and DJ E-Z Rock), complications from diabetes. 
T. Scarlett Epstein, 91, British-Austrian social anthropologist and economist.
Harry Firth, 96, Australian racing driver and team manager.
Peter Hallock, 89, American organist and choirmaster (Compline Choir). 
Vasco Graça Moura, 72, Portuguese lawyer, writer, translator and politician, cancer.
Ilija Ničić, 91, Serbian Olympic sport shooter (1960).
Andréa Parisy, 78, French actress (The Little Bather, Babes a GoGo).
Marlbert Pradd, 69, American basketball player (New Orleans Buccaneers).
Turhan Tezol, 81, Turkish Olympic basketball player (1952).
Marsden Wagner, 84, American obstetrician.

28
 Toimi Alatalo, 85, Finnish cross-country skier, Olympic champion (1960).
Gerard Benson, 83, British poet, cancer. 
Pedro Cunha, 33, Portuguese actor, suicide by asphyxiation.
Barbara Fiske Calhoun, 94, American cartoonist.
Garnet de la Hunt, 80, South African scout, Chairman of the World Scout Committee (1999–2002), cancer.
Damião António Franklin, 63, Angolan Roman Catholic prelate, Archbishop of Luanda (since 2001).
Valeri Goryushev, 40, Russian Olympic silver medallist volleyball player (1996, 2000).
William Honan, 83, American journalist and author, cardiac arrest.
Amaka Igwe, 51, Nigerian film director and producer, asthma attack.
Dennis Kamakahi, 61, American Grammy Award-winning musician, lung cancer.
Richard Kershaw, 80, British broadcaster and journalist.
Ismail Sulemanji Khatri, 76, Indian craftsman.
Derek King, 65, Australian VFL footballer (St Kilda).
Edgar Laprade, 94, Canadian Hall of Fame ice hockey player (New York Rangers).
Walt Matthews, 79, American baseball figure (Houston Astros ).
Kamaruzaman Mohamad, 53, Malaysian journalist and editor (Utusan Malaysia), kidney ailment.
Madan Pande, 70, Indian cricketer.
J. Dwight Pentecost, 99, American Christian theologian.
Sidney Postol, 96, American politician, member of the Connecticut House of Representatives.
Jack Ramsay, 89, American Hall of Fame basketball coach (Portland Trail Blazers), cancer.
Djahanguir Riahi, 99, French antique collector.
Idris Sardi, 75, Indonesian violinist and composer.
Frederic Schwartz, 63, American architect, prostate cancer.
Ryan Tandy, 32, Australian rugby league player involved in match-fixing scandal, drug overdose.
Mitraniketan Viswanathan, 86, Indian social reformer and environmentalist, founder of Mitraniketan.
Bruce Woodgate, 74, British-born American aerospace engineer (NASA), designer and principal investigator for STIS on the Hubble Space Telescope, complications from strokes.

29
Ali Gul Sangi, 61, Pakistani poet.
Beverly Baker Fleitz, 84, American tennis player.
Iveta Bartošová, 48, Czech singer, three-time winner of Zlatý slavík (1986, 1990, 1991), suicide by train.
Graham Bizzell, 72, Australian cricketer.
Frank Budd, 74, American Olympic sprinter (1960) and football player (Philadelphia Eagles, Washington Redskins).
Tahar Chaïbi, 68, Tunisian footballer (Club Africain), complications from a stroke.
M. V. Devan, 86, Indian artist and academic.
Don Earl, 81, Australian footballer.
Al Feldstein, 88, American writer and editor (Mad, Tales from the Crypt).
Reuven Feuerstein, 92, Romanian-born Israeli psychologist. 
Bob Hoskins, 71, English actor (Who Framed Roger Rabbit, Mona Lisa, Hook), pneumonia.
Michael Kadosh, 74, Israeli football player and manager, cancer.
Glenn Osser, 99, American musician, musical arranger, orchestra leader, and songwriter.
Daphne Pochin Mould, 93, British author and photographer.
Norma Pons, 71, Argentine actress and showgirl, natural causes.
Ramil Rodriguez, 72, Filipino actor, lung cancer.
Bassem Sabry, 31, Egyptian journalist, fall.
Gailene Stock, 68, Australian ballet dancer and executive, Director of the Royal Ballet School (since 1999), cancer.
Edgars Vinters, 94, Latvian painter.
Walter Walsh, 106, American FBI agent and Olympic shooter (1948), longest-living Olympic competitor.

30
Michael Brock, 94, British historian.
Khaled Choudhury, 94, Indian theatre personality and artist.
Kartina Dahari, 73, Malaysian singer, ovarian cancer.
Chris Harris, 71, British actor, cancer.
Leo Kraft, 91, American composer.
Volodymyr Kudryavtsev, 79, Ukrainian lyricist.
Julian Lewis, 67, British developmental biologist, cancer.
Marsha Mehran, 36, Iranian-born American author. (body discovered on this date)
Judi Meredith, 77, American actress (Ben Casey, The George Burns and Gracie Allen Show, Hotel de Paree).
Carl E. Moses, 84, American politician, member of the Alaska House of Representatives (1965–1973, 1993–2007).
Ralph Nattrass, 88, Canadian ice hockey player (Chicago Black Hawks).
Larry Ramos, 72, American guitarist, banjo player, and vocalist (The Association), metastatic melanoma.
Deborah Rogers, 76, British literary agent.
Ian Ross, 73, Australian television news presenter (Nine Network, Seven Network), pancreatic cancer.
Yukio Takefuta, 78, Japanese English education scholar.
Sarmad Tariq, 38, Pakistani motivational speaker and paralysis activist, cardiac arrest.
Junichi Watanabe, 80, Japanese writer (A Lost Paradise), prostate cancer.
Mieczysław Wilczek, 82, Polish politician, Minister of Industry (1988–1989).

References

2014-04
 04